The Linux Professional Institute (LPI) is a Canadian non-profit organisation and oriented towards certifications for Linux, BSD and open-source software-based technologies. It was founded in October 1999.

Linux Professional Institute Certification Programs 

The company offers its exams in numerous countries and languages. These exams are primarily multiple choice questions, with some written answers. These are either taken using a computer based system, or using a paper based exam.

The organization allows community participation in creating and updating exams. Persons unaffiliated with the company can use exam Objectives Development wiki, or the Exam Development Mailing List to participate in the creation of new exams and the update of the existing ones. The exams are intended to be distribution-neutral rather than emphasize a particular distribution of family thereof.

LPI has three different certification program tracks:

Essentials Track:

 Linux Professional Institute Linux Essentials

Linux Professional Track:

Linux Professional Institute LPIC-1
Linux Professional Institute LPIC-2
Linux Professional Institute LPIC-3

Open Technology Track:

Linux Professional Institute DevOps Tools Engineer
Linux Professional Institute BSD Specialist

Linux Professional Institute Partner Programs 
Linux Professional Institute's Partner Programs are created to assist companies and organizations that are involved in, use or teach open source.

Organization 
The Linux Professional Institute Inc. was incorporated as a Canadian non-profit organization on October 25, 1999. It is headquartered near Toronto, Ontario, Canada. It is led by a board of directors. Members of the Board are: Jon "maddog" Hall (Chairman), Michinori Nakahara, Emmanuel Nguimbus, Ricardo Prudenciato, Dorothy Gordon, VM (Vicky) Brasseur, Klaus Knopper, Mark Phillips, Uira Ribeiro and Thiago Sobral.

Exams 
The exams are not normally administered by Linux Professional Institute Inc., but instead through one of the Pearson VUE test centres an online through OnVUE. A number of exams are also offered at major Linux and IT trade shows and conferences, where the exams are often available at a reduced price. Beta exams are offered as part of the community feedback process and are free of charge.

International Regional Partners 
LPI seeks to increase adoption of Linux in part through what it terms its "Regional Enablement Initiative" focuses on identifying the partner organizations that can adopt or otherwise promote adoption.

Recertification Policy 
LPI has changed its recertification policy three times from its founding. At first there was no recertification policy, but on September 1, 2004, LPI decided to introduce a ten-year recertification policy. Certification designations earned before September 1, 2004, were considered lifetime designations and were not affected by that policy. Again on December 1, 2006, LPI further reduced the recertification policy to a period of five years. Candidates who have earned LPIC certifications will have to re-certify every five years or alternatively earn a higher certification status even if their certification was earned prior to September 1, 2004. However, certification designations earned prior to September 1, 2003, were considered ACTIVE certifications until September 1, 2008.

See also
 Free and Open Source Software
 Project Management Institute
 ISC²
 Certified Information Systems Security Professional

References

External links

The Linux Professional Institute
LPI Mailing lists
IBM LPI Exam practice resources
Linux Professional Institute Learning Materials

Free and open-source software organizations
Information technology qualifications
Linux companies
Organizations based in Toronto